The 1995–96 British Collegiate American Football League season was the 11th full season of the BCAFL, organised by the British Students American Football Association (BSAFA, now the BAFA).

Changes from last season
Division Changes
There were no changes to the Divisional setup.

Team Changes
Aberdeen Steamrollers withdrew after one season (without playing a match)
Stirling Clansmen withdrew after nine seasons
This reduced the number of teams in BCAFL (for the first time) to 27.

Regular season

Northern Conference, Scottish Division

Northern Conference, Eastern Division

Northern Conference, Central Division

Southern Conference, Eastern Division

Southern Conference, Central Division

Southern Conference, Western Division

Playoffs

Note – the table does not indicate who played home or away in each fixture.

References

External links
 Official BUAFL Website
 Official BAFA Website

1995
1995 in British sport
1996 in British sport
1995 in American football
1996 in American football